Théophile Georges Kassab (5 June 1945 − 22 October 2013) was a Syrian Syriac Catholic archbishop.

Ordained to the priesthood in 1974, Kassab was elected archbishop of the Syriac Metropolitan Archeparchy of Homs, Syria in May 1999, before being ordained archbishop of the title in March 2000.

He died in October 2013, while receiving treatment at the Maronite Saint Georges Hospital in Ajaltoun, Lebanon.

References

1945 births
2013 deaths
People from Homs Governorate
Syriac Catholic bishops
20th-century Eastern Catholic archbishops
21st-century Eastern Catholic archbishops